Kat Pi Ya is a 2017 Burmese drama film, directed by  Ko Zaw (Ar Yone Oo) starring Pyay Ti Oo, Phway Phway, Kaung Pyae. The film, produced by Khayay Phyu Film Production premiered in Myanmar on June 30, 2017.

Cast
Pyay Ti Oo as San Hla Baw
Phway Phway as Mya Chit
Kaung Pyae as Aung Than Kyaw
Moe Di as The Monk
War War Aung as Daw Aye Mal
Thi Yati as Aye Thi
Zwe Lay (child actor) as Kauk Swa

References

2017 films
2010s Burmese-language films
Burmese drama films
Films shot in Myanmar